Gotham Chopra (born Gautam Chopra on February 23, 1975) is an American sports documentarian, media entrepreneur, producer, podcast host, director, journalist, and author. He is a co-founder of Religion of Sports, Liquid Comics, Chopra Media, and the Chopra Well. He is known for his sports-centric films, having worked with athletes such as Tom Brady, LeBron James, Kobe Bryant, Simone Biles, and Michael Strahan.

Early life 
Chopra was born Gautam Chopra in what is now part of the Brigham and Women's Hospital in Boston, Massachusetts in 1975, the son of spiritualist and author Deepak Chopra and his wife, Rita. He is a first-generation American and the first in his family to be born outside of India. He and his sister Mallika were raised in the Boston suburb of Lincoln. As a child, Chopra was extremely interested in sports, enough that his mother worried that he would never have a career. He is a lifelong Red Sox, Patriots, Celtics, and Bruins fan. His favorite athlete while growing up was Larry Bird. At age 13, he went on tour "as a roadie" with Michael Jackson, a friend of his father's, on his Dangerous World Tour. Chopra's father was busy and rarely home during the first years of Chopra's childhood. He recalls that his father drank and smoked a lot until he joined the Transcendental Meditation (TM) movement when Chopra was five. The family as a whole started practicing TM.

Chopra graduated from Belmont Hill School in 1993, then Columbia University with a bachelor's degree in English and Literature. In 1993, while Chopra was in college, the family relocated to California. While at Columbia, he wrote his first book, Child of the Dawn, and helped Michael Jackson write lyrics to his songs.

Career 
After graduating from Columbia, Chopra was a news anchor for the Los Angeles-based Channel One News, which broadcast to teenagers in social studies classes across the United States. He found out later that he was hired because one of the Channel One executives was a fan of his fathers'. He became a war correspondent and was stationed internationally. It was during this time that a producer recommended Chopra change the spelling of his name, Gautam, to match how he pronounced it to prevent mispronunciation. In August 2001, he was arrested at Islamabad International Airport when empty bullet shells were found in his bag. These were a gift from the Taliban, who he had been in Pakistan to interview. His father, at this point popular within celebrity circles, called Colin Powell and arranged his release. Within a few weeks, 9/11 occurred and Chopra's interview tapes were confiscated. Other interviews he conducted during this time were with George W. Bush, John Glenn, and the Dalai Lama. He left Channel One in 2005. Between 2006 and 2008, he worked as a consultant for Current TV.

In 2000, he co-founded Chopra Media with his sister Mallika. This company primarily develops media initiatives for their father but also oversees television shows and films. In 2012, Chopra launched the YouTube channel The Chopra Well along with his father and sister. This channel features a number of healthy and spiritual living tips, guided meditations, and guest interviews. At its debut, Vicente Fox, Paulo Coelho, Lisa Ling, and Fran Drescher were featured. Chopra helped create a virtual reality meditation video game, called Finding Your True Self, with his father in 2016.

In 2006, he, Sharad Devarajan, and Suresh Seetharaman co-founded Virgin Comics and convinced Sir Richard Branson to invest. In 2008, the company changed its name to Liquid Comics following management changes. Chopra co-created the Bulletproof Monk comics with Brett Lewis and R. A. Jones. Chopra also produced the 2003 film based on the series. Devarajan, Chopra, and Seetharaman established Graphic India in 2011 under the Liquid Comics name. This company focuses on the Indian youth market and the creation of characters inspired by Indian myth and legend. Peter Chernin joined the team as an investor in 2013 and is a joint owner of Graphic India.

In 2012, Chopra created, produced, and directed Decoding Deepak about his father. In 2014, Chopra hosted the talk show Help Desk on the Oprah Winfrey Network. In 2015, he was the executive producer on Kobe Bryant's Muse on Showtime. He also directed The Little Master, a documentary about Indian cricketer Sachin Tendulkar as part of ESPN's 30 for 30 series, and directed and produced I Am Giant about New York Giants wide receiver Victor Cruz.

Religion of Sports 
Religion of Sports, a sports-focused media company, was founded in 2016 by Chopra, Michael Strahan, and Tom Brady. Chopra created, directed, produced, and narrated the docuseries Religion of Sports, which examines the profound influence sports can have on societies and cultures beyond entertainment value. The show's third series aired in 2018.

Religion of Sports' Why We Fight, an eight-part docuseries about opioid addiction in sports starring Zachary Wohlman, received a Sports Emmy nomination in 2018 in Outstanding Serialized Sports Documentary. This was Chopra's first Sports Emmy nomination. Also in 2018, Tom vs Time, a docuseries about Tom Brady's off-season training. The series aired on Facebook Watch. It won a Sports Emmy for Outstanding Serialized Sports Documentary in 2019. The same year, Shut Up and Dribble was nominated for Outstanding Open/Tease and Outstanding Sports Promotional Announcement at the Sports Emmys. The three-part docuseries, which aired on Showtime, was inspired by Fox News host Laura Ingraham's February 2017 comment that LeBron James and Kevin Durant should stay out of politics and "shut up and dribble". The series, produced by LeBron James and directed by Chopra, shows "attempts by NBA players to bring about social change and speak up politically" throughout the years. The first season of Greatness Code, which highlights defining moments in athletes' careers, aired in July 2020; the second season aired in May 2022. The ESPN+ series Man in the Arena: Tom Brady, which focuses on Tom Brady's career, was nominated for two Sports Emmys.

Chopra is also involved with several podcasts for Religion of Sports, including as the host for Man in the Arena: Tom Brady and Why Sports Matter (with Tom Brady and Michael Strahan). He produces Crushed, a podcast about steroids in baseball, in collaboration with PRX.

Personal life 
Chopra married doctor Candice Chen c. 1993; the couple have a son, Krishnan. As of 2022, Chopra is based in Los Angeles.

Works

Books and comics

Filmography

External links

References 

1975 births
American people of Indian descent
American male writers of Indian descent
Belmont Hill School alumni
Columbia College (New York) alumni
Comic book publishers (people)
Living people
Writers from Boston
American comics writers
American comics creators
American mass media company founders
Comic book company founders
21st-century American journalists
American television reporters and correspondents
American political journalists
American war correspondents
Imprisoned journalists
Film directors from Los Angeles
American film directors of Indian descent
Film directors from California
American documentary film directors
American television directors
Film producers from California
American documentary film producers
American film production company founders
Television producers from California